The 2016 Conference USA football season was the 21st season of Conference USA football and part of the 2016 NCAA Division I FBS football season. The season began on September 1 with Charlotte facing Louisville. This season was the second season for the C-USA under realignment that took place in 2014, which added the 14th member Charlotte from the Atlantic 10 Conference. The C-USA is a "Group of Five" conference under the College Football Playoff format along with the American Athletic Conference, the Mid-American Conference, the Mountain West Conference, and the Sun Belt Conference.

C-USA consists of 14 members: Charlotte, FIU, Florida Atlantic, Louisiana Tech, Marshall, Middle Tennessee, North Texas, Old Dominion, Rice, Southern Miss, UAB, UTEP, UTSA, and Western Kentucky; and is split up into the East and West divisions. West champion Louisiana Tech played at East champion Western Kentucky's Houchens Industries-L. T. Smith Stadium for the Conference USA Championship on December 3, which Western Kentucky won 58–44. UAB continued to undergo reinstatement of its football program during the 2016 season and will begin play for the 2017 season.

Western Kentucky entered the season as defending Conference USA champions, defeating Southern Miss in the previous year's championship game. The Hilltoppers would then go on to defeat South Florida in the Miami Beach Bowl 45–35.

Preseason

2016 predictions
The 2016 preseason media predictions were released on July 21, 2016 with the vote conducted by media members that cover the conference schools. Middle Tennessee was picked to win the East division for the first time in school history. After coming second in the East last year, which resulted a trip to the Bahamas Bowl, the Blue Raiders returned 13 starters for the upcoming season. In the West division, the media predicted Southern Miss to overcome the other 5 teams in the division. Southern Miss has been in the C-USA championship more than any team in the conference, with 3 appearances including an appearance last season against Western Kentucky. The Golden Eagles brought back seven starters on offense and six starters on defense. Western Kentucky, defending C-USA champion, was predicted to finish second in the East division, instead of returning to the title game.

The twelve annual championship game will be held on December 3, 2016, which is predicted to pit Southern Miss and Middle Tennessee.

West Division
 1. Southern Miss
 2. Louisiana Tech
 3. Rice
 4. UTEP
 5. UTSA
 6. North Texas

East Division
 1. Middle Tennessee
 2. WKU
 3. Marshall
 4. Florida Atlantic
 5. FIU
 6. Old Dominion
 7. Charlotte

References:

Head coaches
Three Conference USA teams hired new head coaches for the 2016 season. All three were in the West Division, and all three were replacing coaches who had spent at least 3 seasons at their respective schools.

 North Texas hired Seth Littrell to replace Dan McCarney, who was fired after the Mean Green lost to Portland State on October 10, 2015. Mike Canales was promoted as interim head coach after the fire until the hire of Littrell. Seth is coming from being an Assistant Head Coach for Offense and Tight Ends Coach at North Carolina. Littrell was hired on December 5, 2015.
 Southern Miss hired Jay Hopson to replace Todd Monken, who resigned to become the new Offensive Coordinator for the Tampa Bay Buccaneers after the 2015 season. Jay spent has spent four years prior to Southern Miss at Alcorn State and help bring the Braves to two SWAC Championship Titles. Hopson was hired on January 30, 2016.
 UTSA hired Frank Wilson to replace Larry Coker, who resigned on January 5, 2016. Wilson is come from being a Running Backs Coach and a Recruiting Coordinator at LSU for 7 seasons. Frank was hired on January 14, 2016.

Note: All stats shown are before the beginning of the season.

C-USA vs other conferences

C-USA vs power conferences

This is a list of the power conference teams (ACC, Big Ten, Big 12, Pac-12, SEC) C-USA plays in non-conference (Rankings from the AP Poll):

2016 records against non-conference opponents

Regular season

Post season

Postseason

Bowl games

Per conference regulations, all teams with seven or more wins shall be placed into conference bowls prior to any other bowl eligible teams without a winning record (i.e. 6–6 record). The rankings are from final CFP Poll and all game times are in Eastern. Old Dominion was the first team to accept a bowl bid on November 28.

 Additional bowl game offer. C-USA had no previous arrangement to play in the Armed Forces Bowl.

Postseason awards
Most Valuable Player:Ryan Higgins
Offensive Player of the Year:Carlos Henderson
Defensive Player of the Year:Trey Hendrickson
Coach of the Year:Skip Holtz
Freshman of the Year:Josiah Tauaefa
Newcomer of the Year:Mike White

All C-USA

Home game attendance

Bold – Exceed capacity
†Season High

References